In the United Arab Emirates, cricket had a very limited presence in the 19th and most of the 20th century. In less than a decade after independence, the massive influx of South Asians increased crickets popularity. After the establishment of the Emirates Cricket Board in 1989, the United Arab Emirates officially became an affiliate member of the ICC. In the following year, the UAE became an associate member, with the likes of Kenya. In 1996, the UAE competed in the Cricket World Cup, with their debut along with Kenya and The Netherlands making them the 14th team to compete at the World Cup. They did not qualify for the World Cup until 2015, where they are currently playing in Pool B.

Cricket World Cup Record

World Cup Record (By Team)

1996 Cricket World Cup
The United Arab Emirates was placed in Group B along with South Africa, Pakistan, New Zealand, England and The Netherlands. They were first up against South Africa, which batted first and posted a score of 321/2. Gary Kirsten top scored with a blitzing 188 Not Out. The UAE were restricted to just 152/8 from 50 overs, with Arshad Laeeq top scoring with 43.

Two days later, the UAE played against England batting first. The top order collapsed and the UAE were bowled out for 136 from 48.3 overs. England, led by Graham Thorpe's 44 Not Out, cruised to victory in 35 overs with 8 wickets to spare.

The UAE next played co-hosts Pakistan. Batting first, they slumped to 109/9 from 33 overs, with Mushtaq Ahmed taking 3/16. Pakistan replied strongly, winning by 9 wickets in just 18 overs.

Down and out, the UAE next played New Zealand, who batted first. New Zealand posted 276/8 from 47 overs, with Roger Twose posting a match high 92. The UAE again failed to cross 200, posting 167/9. New Zealand won by 109 runs.

For their last game, the United Arab Emirates faced fellow associate The Netherlands. After batting first, The Netherlands posted a modest score of 216/9 from their 50 overs, with Shaukat Dukanwala taking 5/29. The UAE replied with confidence, winning by 7 wickets with 5.4 overs to spare. Shaukat Dukanwala became the first UAE player to be named the Man of the Match at any Cricket World Cup game.

2015 Cricket World Cup

United Arab Emirates vs Zimbabwe

Ireland vs United Arab Emirates

India vs United Arab Emirates

Pakistan vs United Arab Emirates

South Africa vs United Arab Emirates

United Arab Emirates vs West Indies

References

Cricket in the United Arab Emirates
United Arab Emirates in international cricket
History of the Cricket World Cup